Joseph Mar Thoma XXI (27 June 1931 – 18 October 2020) was the 21st Mar Thoma Syrian Church Metropolitan and the church’s primate.

Early days

Palakunnathu family
In the seventeenth century Kerala, a member of the Panamkuzhy house of Kuruvalingadu, Kuruvilla, came and settled in Kozhencherry on the banks of the Pampa river. Later, he and his three sons moved to Maramon and lived at Chackkalyil on the other side of the river. The second son's second son in that family, Mathen, moved to a nearby house at Palakunnathu. He had six sons and two daughters. The daughter was married to the Mallapally Pavoothikunnel family, and the first four sons moved to Themoottil, Neduvelil (Kozhenchery), Periyilel, and Punamadom (Othera). The fifth son was a celibate priest (Sanyasi Achen). As was the custom, the youngest son Mathew lived at the Palakunnathu family house and married Pandanattu Mullasseril Mariamma, this house still exists. Abraham Malpan, a leader of reformation in the Malankara church was the second son of Mathew and Mariamma. Mar Thoma XIII was his nephew, his older brother's son. Thomas Mar Athanasius Metropolitan (Mar Thoma XIV) and Titus I Mar Thoma Metropolitan (Mar Thoma XV) were the sons of Abraham Malpan.

A number of other Malankara Church, and Marthoma Church leaders were also born in this family. Abraham Malpan, Mathews Mar Athanasius Metropolitan (Mar Thoma XIII), Thomas Mar Athanasius Metropolitan (Mar Thoma XIV)  and Titus II Mar Thoma were from this family. Joseph Mar Thoma (Mar Thoma XXI), is also from this family.

Early life
P.T. Joseph was born on 27 June 1931, as the son of Palakunnathu T. Lukose of Maramon Palakunnathu Kadon House and Mariamma, of Nedumpriyattu, Maramon Puthoor House.

After his education at Maramon and Kozhencherry, he joined Union Christian College, Aluva where he played for the college basketball team.

Ordination
Joseph always wanted an academic career, but when he was called to take up theological studies, he readily accepted it. So, in 1954, he joined the United Theological College, Bangalore, Karnataka, India, and obtained a Bachelor of Divinity degree.

He was ordained as deacon of the Mar Thoma Church on 29 June 1957, and kasseessa (priest) on 18 October 1957. He then went on to study at the Protestant Episcopal Seminary in Virginia, USA. From there, he went to Canterbury and Oxford in England and obtained Master of Divinity (M.Div.) and Master of Sacred Theology (STM) degrees. He was later awarded an honorary Doctor of Divinity degree by the Virginia Seminary, where he studied.

Consecration
Realizing the need for more bishops for the Mar Thoma Church, the Church Mandalam (representative assembly) in 1974, decided to consecrate two more bishops. The Rev. P.T. Joseph was one of those who were selected. He was ordained as Ramban on 11 January 1975.

Episcopa
On 8 February 1975, Juhanon Mar Thoma, Metropolitan, assisted by the other bishops of the church ordained the Rev. P.T. Joseph and was given the episcopal title of Joseph Mar Irenaeus. Rev. V.T. Koshy, Easow Mar Timotheos, was also ordained on the same day.

Suffragan metropolitan
On March 15, 1999, he was designated as suffragan metropolitan when Philipose Mar Chrysostom, the suffragan metropolitan, was designated as the officiating metropolitan.

Metropolitan

Malankara throne

After the swearing-in of 1653 it became necessary to appoint a bishop. For this purpose, a special chair was made and Mar Thoma I the first bishop of Malankara Church was enthroned. This throne, used for the consecration of Mar Thoma I, is in the possession of the Mar Thoma Church and is kept at Tiruvalla. It has been used in the installation of every Mar Thoma metropolitan to this day so that the continuity of the throne of Mar Thoma is ensured. This was the throne used for the consecration of Mar Thoma XXI, Joseph Mar Thoma Metropolitan.

Enthronement
Joseph Mar Irenaeus was installed as Mar Thoma XXI Metropolitan on 2 October 2007 when the 20th Mar Thoma, Philipose Mar Chrysostom expressed his desire to transfer responsibilities of the church to his successor due to old age and deteriorating health. He continued as 'Valiya Metropolitan' or Metropolitan Emeritus.

Contributions

He was the President of the National Council of Churches in India, Senior President of CCA, and the chairman of CASA.

His activities included sanctions of building many socio-spiritual centers with  monuments, like Tharangam - Mission Action Centre, which can also be used as the secondary venue for diocese activities that were previously held adjacent to the spacious building near the Bishop House. 

Introduction of music and other attractive worship styles to target the younger generation (via the DSMC studio, blogs, and camps).

Joseph Mar Thoma advocated protecting the environment. He has warned that atrocities to nature are suicidal and has urged people to take remedial measures by adopting responsible green conservatism. He also personally campaigned for the protection of Pampa River on whose bed the famed Maramon Convention is hosted.

Ordination dates

Succession

Death
Joseph Mar Thoma died on 18 October 2020 at 2:38 AM as a result of pancreatic cancer.

See also
 Throne of St. Thomas
 Syrian Malabar Nasrani
 Saint Thomas Christians
 Christianity in India
 List of Syrian Malabar Nasranis

References

Further reading
 Mathew, N. M. Malankara Marthoma Sabha Charitram (History of the Marthoma Church), Volume 1 (2006), Volume II (2007), Volume III (2008). Pub. E.J. Institute, Thiruvalla.

External links
 
 marthomachurch.in

1932 births
Mar Thoma Syrian Church
People from Pathanamthitta district
Saint Thomas Christians
Malayali people
Metropolitans of the Mar Thoma Syrian Church
Pakalomattam family
Christian clergy from Kerala
2020 deaths
Deaths from pancreatic cancer
Deaths from cancer in India